Kieran Richard Hardy (born 30 November 1995) is a Welsh professional rugby union player who primarily plays scrum-half for the Scarlets of the United Rugby Championship. He has also represented Wales at international level, having made his test debut against Georgia during the Autumn Nations Cup. Hardy has previously played for clubs such as the Jersey Reds in the past.

Club career 
Hardy first played for local side Pontyberem RFC until the age of 16. He began his professional career with Carmarthen Quins, while progressing through the age grade ranks with the Scarlets. Despite making his professional debut with the Scarlets in 2014, he departed the club in 2016 in order to gain experience and game time, as it was limited with competition in the scrum half jersey. Hardy subsequently joined RFU Championship club Jersey Reds, along with Scarlet teammate Regan King. 

In his first season with Jersey, Hardy helped the club reach the final of the British and Irish Cup. Jersey lost to Munster A 29–28, despite Hardy scoring a try in the fixture. Hardy extended his contract for one more season, in 2017.

In 2018 Hardy was voted Player of the Season, before departing Jersey. Hardy rejoined the Scarlets ahead of the 2018–19 Pro14 season, following the departure of Aled Davies.

Hardy was voted Breakthrough Player of the Season in his first term back in Llanelli, scoring seven tries in 18 matches. He was voted Player of the Month for October 2019, scoring multiple impactful tries early in the season.

International career 
In 2015, Hardy was selected for Wales U20, featuring in the 2015 Six Nations Under 20s Championship and 2015 World Rugby Under 20 Championship.

On 6 October 2020 Hardy was named in the senior Wales squad for the 2020 Autumn Nations Cup. He made his debut for Wales on the 18 November 2020 in the starting line up for the 18-0 win against Georgia. His halfback partner for the fixture was Callum Sheedy, who played alongside Hardy for Jersey in 2017 while on loan from Bristol. Hardy scored his first international try on 5 December 2020, against Italy.

Hardy retained his place in the Welsh squad for the 2021 Six Nations. He made his first Six Nations appearance on 13 February 2021, coming off the bench against Scotland. Hardy was selected to start the following match against England, and scored a try as Wales won 40–24, securing the Triple Crown. After suffering a hamstring injury during the match, Hardy was subsequently ruled out of the remainder of the tournament, as Wales won the championship title.

Upon returning to fitness, Hardy was once against selected for the Wales squad for the summer tests against Canada and Argentina. Hardy featured in the 2021 end-of-year rugby union internationals, and scored his third test try during the match against Fiji. 

During the 2022 Six Nations, Hardy once again scored against England, appearing three times off the bench during the tournament. That summer he was selected for the 2022 Wales rugby union tour of South Africa, and started all three tests. During the tour, Wales won the second test 13–12, securing a first ever win over the Springboks in South Africa.

Hardy was selected for the 2022 end-of-year rugby union internationals, coming off the bench against New Zealand and Australia. Hardy retained his place in the squad for the 2023 Six Nations, having been selected by returning head coach Warren Gatland.

List of international test tries

References

External links

 WRU profile
 Scarlets profile

Welsh rugby union players
Wales international rugby union players
Rugby union players from Carmarthen
Scarlets players
Living people
1995 births
Jersey Reds players
Rugby union scrum-halves